I'm Jessi Colter is the second studio album by American country music artist, Jessi Colter. The album was released on Capitol Records in January 1975 and was produced by Ken Mansfield. The release contained the single, "I'm Not Lisa," which peaked at #1 on the country chart and #4 on the Billboard Hot 100.

Background
I'm Jessi Colter was Colter's first studio album for the Capitol label. The album spawned two major hits: "I'm Not Lisa," which became Colter's first major hit, and "What's Happened to Blue Eyes," which peaked at #5 on the Billboard Country Chart. The latter's B-side, "You Ain't Never Been Loved (Like I'm Gonna Love You)" peaked at #64 on the Billboard Hot 100 in 1975. The two singles were Colter's only solo Top 10 singles.

Colter's album was enormously successful, peaking at #4 on the Top Country Albums chart and #50 on the Billboard 200 albums chart. The release was given a positive review from Allmusic, who gave the album four out of five stars.

Track listing
All songs composed by Jessi Colter:

"Is There Any Way (You'd Stay Forever)" — 2:45
"I Hear a Song" — 2:43
"Come on In" — 2:30
"You Ain't Never Been Loved (Like I'm Gonna Love You)" — 2:57
"Love's the Only Chain" — 3:16
"I'm Not Lisa" — 3:23
"For the First Time" — 2:38
"Who Walks Thru' Your Memory (Billy Jo)" — 2:20
"What's Happened to Blue Eyes" — 2:19
"Storms Never Last" — 4:14

Personnel
Recorded at Glaser Sound Studios in Nashville, Tennessee, United States and Sound Factory in Los Angeles, California, United States.
Jessi Colter - lead vocals
 Lea Jane Berinati — backing vocals
 Tommy Cogbill — bass
 Johnny Gimble — fiddle
 Duke Goff — bass
 Jim Gordon — horn
 Dick Hyde — horn
 Waylon Jennings — producer, guitar
 Mack Johnson — horn
 Bruce King — backing vocals (track 3)
 Ken Mansfield — producer
 Marge McMahon — backing vocals
 Lee Montgomery — backing vocals
 Ralph Mooney — steel guitar
 Larry Muhoberac — piano, strings
 Weldon Myrick — steel guitar
 Elmo Peeler — strings
 Billy Ray Reynolds — backing vocals
 Wendy Suits — backing vocals
 John Buck Wilkins — guitar, backing vocals
 Marijohn Wilkin — backing vocals
 Sharon Vaughn — backing vocals
 Reggie Young — guitar

Charts

Weekly charts

Year-end charts

Singles - Billboard (United States), RPM (Canada)

References

1975 albums
Jessi Colter albums
albums produced by Waylon Jennings
Capitol Records albums